Cylas formicarius, the sweet potato weevil, is a species of sweet potato weevil in the beetle family Brentidae. It is found in Africa, Australia, the Caribbean, Europe, Northern Asia (excluding China), Central America, North America, Oceania, South America, Southern Asia, the Pacific Ocean, and temperate Asia.

References

Further reading

External links

 

Brentidae
Articles created by Qbugbot
Beetles described in 1798
Sweet potatoes